Martin Ridge is a broad ice-covered ridge. 

Martin Ridge may also refer to:
 Martin Ridge (historian) (1923–2003), American historian

See also 
 Martin Mountain Ridge, a ridge located in Allegany County, Maryland
 Martin Ridge Cave System, a large cave near Mammoth Cave, Kentucky